Due its geography and geology, the Falkland Islands has no particularly large rivers. Those of some length tend to be sluggish, often ending in one of the frequent fjords or large inlets surrounding the Islands (such as San Carlos Water or Byron Sound) as creeks. However, as the Islands receive high precipitation, there are many small streams to be found on them.

East Falkland
 Malo River/Arroyo Malo
 Moody Brook
 Mullet Creek
 Murrell River
 San Carlos River

West Falkland
 Blackburn River
 Chartres River
 Warrah River
 Green Hills/Green Hill Stream.

See also
 Geology of the Falkland Islands

 
Falkland